Gorenje Jezero is a village on the southern edge of Lake Cerknica in the Municipality of Cerknica in the Inner Carniola region of Slovenia.

Name
The name Gorenje Jezero means 'upper lake' and is a semantic contrast to the neighboring village of Dolenje Jezero (literally, 'lower lake'), which stands about  lower in elevation. Like other villages named Jezero, the name refers to a local landscape element—in this case, Lake Cerknica.

Church

The local church is in the southwest part of the settlement. It is dedicated to Saint Cantius and belongs to the Parish of Stari Trg pri Ložu.

References

External links 

Gorenje Jezero on Geopedia

Populated places in the Municipality of Cerknica